Roland Jacobi (9 March 1893 – 22 May 1951) was a male international table tennis player from Hungary.

He was the first ever men's singles world champion at the 1926 World Table Tennis Championships and won six medals in singles, doubles and team events in the World Table Tennis Championships between 1926 and 1928.

See also
 List of table tennis players
 List of World Table Tennis Championships medalists

References

External links
 Wiesław Pięta, Aleksandra Pięta , Czech and Polish Table Tennis Players of Jewish Origin in International Competition (1926-1957), PHYSICAL CULTURE AND SPORT. STUDIES AND RESEARCH

Hungarian male table tennis players
1893 births
1951 deaths
Jewish table tennis players